Sergio Andres Peraza Avila is an artist sculptor from Mexico.

Biography

Sergio Peraza Avila's academic education is in "Ceramic shell and bronze casting" at the Fine Arts University of Philadelphia, Pennsylvania (1992).  He also studied at the Academia of San Carlos/Escuela Nacional de Artes Plásticas (National University of Plastic Arts), Universidad Nacional Autónoma de Mexico (UNAM), Mexico City and in 1986-87 he studied Graphic Design at Autonomous University of Guadalajara.(UAG) Jalisco, Mexico.

In 1988 he joined the International Conference on Public Sculpture at Trinity College.

In 1990 Peraza Avila had a Collective art show called "Primera Jornada Cultural" at the Acapulco Plaza Hotel with Tamayo, Anguiano and Cuevas works; he was the youngest artist at the show, and became a celebrity in Acapulco newspapers.
 
In 1991 Sergio was co-author with his brother Humberto of the three bronze monuments of 8 ft. (2.46m); each dedicated to Ricardo Palmerin, Guty Cárdenas and José Domínguez; Mexican Bolero composers and songwriters from the Yucatán area of Mexico. These statues are in front of the Museum of the Yucatán Music in the city of Mérida. In 1992 Sergio made the bronze monument of 7 ft. 2.15m)dedicated to Ruben Pabello, newspaper director in the city of Xalapa, Mexico, and became a member of the International Sculpture Center in Washington, DC.

In 1993, Sergio became acquainted with several Buddhist associations in Mexico City, he then created the Multimedia Installation "The liberation of the Smogmen" (66x21x12 ft.(2.3x6.5x7m)); sponsored by Amnesty International and an ecological group, in one of the last fabricclarity which closed in the south of Mexico City. He then became video director and producer of "Gaden Shartse Monks, the Mexico experience", an art video for Mexico's Tibet human rights association, Tibet’s House, New York City.

In the winter of 1994 was the debut solo exhibit, "oneman show" of his own work "Los Perazos de Peraza", the first retrospective of his sculpture, painting, engravings and drawing work, at the Centro Cultural Veracruzano in Coyoacan. Based on a small maquette by his father Humberto Peraza Ojeda, Sergio made the technical development and enlargement to 10 ft. (3.1m) of the monument in honor of the actor Mario Moreno, the  well-known "Cantinflas";  this sculpture can be seen in the bullring of Mexico City and is a unique bronze sculpture signed by Perazas, both father and son.
In 1996 he left Mexico and moved to the '13eme arrondisment' which is the genuine Parisien artistic area. During this time he participated in various exhibitions around France. He met many famous art people including Rhodia Bourdelle, Maria Felix, Antoine Tsvapoff, Sculptor Cesar Baldiaccian, the 'bande dessinateur' Albert Uderzo, and French painter, Mandrisse, who let Sergio use his gallery's basement to paint his oil canvases.

Sergio's first European solo exposition was in 1997 and appeared at the Rue de Longchamp, Paris and was sponsored by the Embassy of Mexico and entitled 'D'un Siecle a L'Autre'.

Sergio's most acclaimed solo exposition was 'Animas y Perros' (Animals and Dogs) at the Museo del Tempo Mayor INAH (Aztec Temple Museum), Mexico City. This was the first time Sergio presented his creations of 'Xolo-Sculptures (the subject was a contemporary view of the Mexican hairless dog, xoloitzcuintli, which appears in the myths of the ancient pre-Columbian cultures).

From then until now he has worked hard, mainly in Mexico, and it has taken him 10 years to get back to Paris to exhibit his artwork. In December 2010 Sergio was invited to by the Societe Nationale des Beaux Arts to join the international art show 'Salon 2009 Carrousel du Louvre'. It was a dream come true for him when he showed his symbolist abstract bronze sculpture 'Semiotica' down the crystal pyramid of the Louvre Museum.

2010–2011 He was invited by Mr. S.V.Titlinov Director of Yekaterinburg Art Foundation to the International Exhibition of Sculpture "In Family Unity- Unity of the World" as a representative of Mexico with his bronze sculpture "Tatlizcuintli" (fatherhood and xoloitzcuintli nahuatl word). This International Art-show took place at the Moscow State Institute of International Relations (University) of the MFA of Russia.

Other aspects of his work.

Between 1985–1995 famous Mexican painter, Raul Anguiano, was Sergio's mentor in the graphical art world. Sergio also collaborated with Maestro Anguiano on the creation of three mural paintings and became his closest 'sketch-pal' until the last days of Anguiano who died in 1996.

Sergio enjoys lecturing on his sculptor spirituality and sculpting struggles and his personal art travelling, past and present.

He was guest lecturer many times around Mexico and abroad, for example, Universidad Tecnica del Norte, Equator in 2007 and Fudan University, Shanghai, China in 2010.

References

External links
 Sergio Peraza website

Living people
Mexican sculptors
Male sculptors
Year of birth missing (living people)
Place of birth missing (living people)